A partial solar eclipse occurred on August 20–21, 1971. A solar eclipse occurs when the Moon passes between Earth and the Sun, thereby totally or partly obscuring the image of the Sun for a viewer on Earth. A partial solar eclipse occurs in the polar regions of the Earth when the center of the Moon's shadow misses the Earth.
It was visible near sunrise on August 21 over parts of Australia.

Related eclipses

Solar eclipses of 1968–1971

References

External links 

1971 8 20
1971 in science
1971 8 20
August 1971 events